The 2005 Portuguese legislative election took place on 20 February. The election renewed all 230 members of the Assembly of the Republic.

These elections were called after the decision of President Jorge Sampaio on 30 November 2004 to dissolve the Parliament as an answer to the political instability caused by the government led by Pedro Santana Lopes (PSD) in coalition with the PP. Santana Lopes had become Prime Minister in July 2004, after José Manuel Durão Barroso left the country in order to become President of the European Commission in a decision that divided the country, because many Portuguese were expecting that the Socialist President Jorge Sampaio would dissolve the Parliament and call a legislative election. However, after five unstable months, President Sampaio decided to dissolve Parliament and call fresh elections. The Prime Minister nevertheless announced the resignation of the government on 11 December, in an action with no practical effects whatsoever.

The campaign started officially on 6 February and the major topics were the problematic state of the country's finances, unemployment, abortion and even José Sócrates's alleged homosexuality.

Headed by Sócrates, the centre-left Socialist Party (PS) won the election with a landslide victory, winning in 19 of the 22 electoral constituencies, including in districts such as Viseu and Bragança that historically voted for the right. The Socialist Party conquered its first absolute majority, receiving 45% of the electorate vote and 52% of the seats in the Parliament, making this the Socialists' largest ever victory in terms of vote percentage and seat count as of 2022. The centre-right parties, mainly the Social Democrats, were punished for their performance in government, and lost more than 11% of votes they had garnered in the previous election. On the left, the Left Bloc achieved its best result ever and made the biggest climb, gaining 5 MPs, while the CDU (Communists and the Greens) gained 2 MPs and reversed their downward trend of the last elections.

Voter turnout was the highest since 1995, as 64.3% of the electorate cast a ballot.

Background

Fall of the government
Deep disagreements and disputes within the Social Democratic Party began to derail the government led by Pedro Santana Lopes. One of those disputes, the resignation of Youth and Sports Minister, Henrique Chaves, which was a close ally of Santana, precipitated the fall of the government, as Chaves accused Santana of not being "loyal and truthful". Following this, President Jorge Sampaio had "enough" of crisis and accused the government of "contradictions and lack of coordination that contributed to its discredit". Therefore, Sampaio used his power of dissolution of Parliament and called a snap election, the only time till date such power was used in Portuguese democracy. A new election was called, by the President, for February 2005.

Leadership changes

PS 2004 leadership election
On early July 2004, PS leader Eduardo Ferro Rodrigues resigned from the leadership against President Jorge Sampaio decision to nominate Pedro Santana Lopes as Prime Minister, following the resignation of Durão Barroso, rather than calling a snap legislative election. New elections to select a new leader were called for 25 and 26 September 2004. Former environment minister José Sócrates, Manuel Alegre and the son of former President Mário Soares, João Soares, contested the leadership ballot. José Sócrates was elected by a landslide and the results were the following:

|- style="background-color:#E9E9E9"
! align="center" colspan=2 style="width:  60px"|Candidate
! align="center" style="width:  50px"|Votes
! align="center" style="width:  50px"|%
|-
|bgcolor=|
| align=left | José Sócrates
| align=right | 18,432
| align=right | 78.6
|-
|bgcolor=|
| align=left | Manuel Alegre
| align=right | 3,903
| align=right | 16.7
|-
|bgcolor=|
| align=left | João Soares
| align=right | 927
| align=right | 4.0
|-
| colspan=2 align=left | Blank/Invalid ballots
| align=right | 175
| align=right | 0.7
|-
|- style="background-color:#E9E9E9"
| colspan=2 style="text-align:left;" |   Turnout
| align=right | 23,437
| align=center | 
|-
| colspan="4" align=left|Source: Results
|}

PCP 2004 leadership election
In the fall of 2004, PCP leader Carlos Carvalhas decided to step down from the party's leadership after 12 years in the post. Jerónimo de Sousa was selected as candidate for the leadership and was elected in the party's congress during the weekend of 27 and 28 November 2004. The results were the following:

|- style="background-color:#E9E9E9"
! align="center" colspan=2 style="width:  60px"|Candidate
! align="center" style="width:  50px"|Votes
! align="center" style="width:  50px"|%
|-
|bgcolor=#f00|
| align=left | Jerónimo de Sousa
| align=right | 164
| align=right | 93.7
|-
| colspan=2 align=left | Against
| align=right | 1
| align=right | 0.6
|-
| colspan=2 align=left | Abstention
| align=right | 10
| align=right | 5.7
|-
|- style="background-color:#E9E9E9"
| colspan=2 style="text-align:left;" |   Turnout
| align=right | 175
| align=center | 
|-
| colspan="4" align=left|Source: Results
|}

Electoral system 

The Assembly of the Republic has 230 members elected to four-year terms. Governments do not require absolute majority support of the Assembly to hold office, as even if the number of opposers of government is larger than that of the supporters, the number of opposers still needs to be equal or greater than 116 (absolute majority) for both the Government's Programme to be rejected or for a motion of no confidence to be approved.

The number of seats assigned to each district depends on the district magnitude. The use of the d'Hondt method makes for a higher effective threshold than certain other allocation methods such as the Hare quota or Sainte-Laguë method, which are more generous to small parties.

For these elections, and compared with the 2002 elections, the MPs distributed by districts were the following:

Parties
The table below lists the parties represented in the Assembly of the Republic during the 9th legislature (2002–2005) and that also partook in the election:

Campaign period

Party slogans

Candidates' debates

Opinion polling

National summary of votes and seats

|-
| colspan=11| 
|-  
! rowspan=2 colspan=2 style="background-color:#E9E9E9;text-align:left;" |Parties
! rowspan=2 style="background-color:#E9E9E9;text-align:right;" |Votes
! rowspan=2 style="background-color:#E9E9E9;text-align:right;" |%
! rowspan=2 style="background-color:#E9E9E9;text-align:right;" |±
! colspan="5" style="background-color:#E9E9E9;text-align:center;" |MPs
! rowspan="2" style="background-color:#E9E9E9;text-align:right;" |MPs %/votes %
|- style="background-color:#E9E9E9"
! style="background-color:#E9E9E9;text-align:center;" |2002
! style="background-color:#E9E9E9;text-align:center;" |2005
! style="background-color:#E9E9E9;text-align:right;" |±
! style="background-color:#E9E9E9;text-align:right;" |%
! style="background-color:#E9E9E9;text-align:right;" |±
|-
| 
|2,588,312||45.03||7.2||96||121||25||52.61||10.9||1.17
|-
| 
|1,653,425||28.77||11.4||105||75||30||32.61||13.0||1.13
|-
| 
|433,369||7.54||0.6||12||14||2||6.09||0.9||0.81
|-
| 
|416,415||7.25||1.5||14||12||2||5.22||0.9||0.72
|-  
| 
|364,971||6.35||3.6||3||8||5||3.48||2.2||0.55
|-
| 
|48,186||0.84||0.2||0||0||0||0.00||0.0||0.0
|-
| 
|40,358||0.70||||||0||||0.00||||0.0
|-
| 
|17,056||0.30||0.1||0||0||0||0.00||0.0||0.0
|-
| 
|9,374||0.16||0.1||0||0||0||0.00||0.0||0.0
|-
|style="width:10px;background-color:red;text-align:center;" | 
| style="text-align:left;" |Workers Party of Socialist Unity
|5,535||0.10||0.0||0||0||0||0.00||0.0||0.0
|-
| 
|1,618||0.03||||||0||||0.00||||0.0
|-
|colspan=2 style="text-align:left;background-color:#E9E9E9"|Total valid 
|width="65" style="text-align:right;background-color:#E9E9E9"|5,578,782
|width="40" style="text-align:right;background-color:#E9E9E9"|97.06
|width="40" style="text-align:right;background-color:#E9E9E9"|1.0
|width="40" style="text-align:right;background-color:#E9E9E9"|230
|width="40" style="text-align:right;background-color:#E9E9E9"|230
|width="40" style="text-align:right;background-color:#E9E9E9"|0
|width="40" style="text-align:right;background-color:#E9E9E9"|100.00
|width="40" style="text-align:right;background-color:#E9E9E9"|0.0
|width="40" style="text-align:right;background-color:#E9E9E9"|—
|-
|colspan=2|Blank ballots
|103,537||1.80||0.8||colspan=6 rowspan=4|
|-
|colspan=2|Invalid ballots
|65,515||1.14||0.2
|-
|colspan=2 style="text-align:left;background-color:#E9E9E9"|Total 
|width="65" style="text-align:right;background-color:#E9E9E9"|5,747,834
|width="40" style="text-align:right;background-color:#E9E9E9"|100.00
|width="40" style="text-align:right;background-color:#E9E9E9"|
|-
|colspan=2|Registered voters/turnout
||8,944,508||64.26||2.8
|-
| colspan=11 style="text-align:left;" | Source: Comissão Nacional de Eleições
|}

Distribution by constituency

|- class="unsortable"
!rowspan=2|Constituency!!%!!S!!%!!S!!%!!S!!%!!S!!%!!S
!rowspan=2|TotalS
|- class="unsortable" align="center"
!colspan=2 | PS
!colspan=2 | PSD
!colspan=2 | CDU
!colspan=2 | CDS-PP
!colspan=2 | BE
|-
|align="left"| Azores
| style="background:; color:white;"|53.1
| 3
| 34.4
| 2
| 1.7
| -
| 4.0
| -
| 2.9
| -
| 5
|-
|align="left"| Aveiro
| style="background:; color:white;"|41.1
| 8
| 35.7
| 6
| 3.5
| -
| 9.8
| 1
| 5.1
| -
| 15
|-
|align="left"| Beja
| style="background:; color:white;"|51.0
| 2
| 12.3
| -
| 24.1
| 1
| 2.9
| -
| 4.7
| -
| 3
|-
|align="left"| Braga
| style="background:; color:white;"|45.4
| 9
| 32.9
| 7
| 4.8
| 1
| 7.8
| 1
| 4.6
| -
| 18
|-
|align="left"| Bragança
| style="background:; color:white;"|42.1
| 2
| 39.0
| 2
| 2.0
| -
| 9.7
| -
| 2.5
| -
| 4
|-
|align="left"| Castelo Branco
| style="background:; color:white;"|56.0
| 4
| 26.7
| 1
| 3.8
| -
| 5.3
| -
| 3.7
| -
| 5
|-
|align="left"| Coimbra
| style="background:; color:white;"|45.4
| 6
| 31.9
| 4
| 5.5
| -
| 5.5
| -
| 6.3
| -
| 10
|-
|align="left"| Évora
| style="background:; color:white;"|49.7
| 2
| 16.7
| -
| 20.9
| 1
| 3.7
| -
| 4.6
| -
| 3
|-
|align="left"| Faro
| style="background:; color:white;"|49.3
| 6
| 24.6
| 2
| 6.9
| -
| 5.8
| -
| 7.7
| -
| 8
|-
|align="left"| Guarda
| style="background:; color:white;"|46.8
| 2
| 34.7
| 2
| 2.9
| -
| 7.0
| -
| 3.4
| - 
| 4
|-
|align="left"| Leiria
| 35.6
| 4
| style="background:; color:white;"|39.8
| 5
| 4.6
| -
| 8.9
| 1
| 5.5
| - 
| 10
|-
|align="left"| Lisbon
| style="background:; color:white;"|44.1
| 23
| 23.7
| 12
| 9.8
| 5
| 8.2
| 4
| 8.8
| 4
| 48
|-
|align="left"| Madeira
| 35.0
| 3
| style="background:; color:white;"|45.2
| 3
| 3.6
| -
| 6.6
| -
| 3.8
| -
| 6
|-
|align="left"| Portalegre
| style="background:; color:white;"|54.9
| 2
| 20.2
| -
| 12.1
| -
| 4.2
| -
| 4.6
| -
| 2
|-
|align="left"| Porto
| style="background:; color:white;"|48.5
| 20
| 27.8
| 12
| 5.4
| 2
| 6.9
| 2
| 6.7
| 2
| 38
|-
|align="left"| Santarém
| style="background:; color:white;"|46.1
| 6
| 26.4
| 3
| 8.6
| 1
| 6.9
| -
| 6.5
| -
| 10
|-
|align="left"| Setúbal
| style="background:; color:white;"|43.6
| 8
| 16.1
| 3
| 20.0
| 3
| 5.1
| 1
| 10.3
| 2
| 17
|-
|align="left"| Viana do Castelo
| style="background:; color:white;"|42.0
| 3
| 33.5
| 2
| 3.8
| -
| 11.4
| 1
| 4.5
| -
| 6
|-
|align="left"| Vila Real
| style="background:; color:white;"|43.8
| 3
| 40.2
| 2
| 2.6
| -
| 6.8
| -
| 2.4
| -
| 5
|-
|align="left"| Viseu
| style="background:; color:white;"|40.4
| 4
| 40.2
| 4
| 2.2
| -
| 8.6
| 1
| 3.3
| -
| 9
|-
|style="text-align:left;" |Europe
| style="background:; color:white;"|54.3
| 1
| 27.2
| 1
| 4.2
| -
| 3.4
| -
| 2.3
| -
| 2
|-
|style="text-align:left;" |Outside Europe
| 26.3
| -
| style="background:; color:white;"|57.7
| 2
| 1.0
| -
| 3.5
| -
| 0.7
| -
| 2
|-
|- class="unsortable" style="background:#E9E9E9"
|align="left"| Total
| style="background:; color:white;"|45.0
| 121
| 28.8
| 75
| 7.5
| 14
| 7.2
| 12
| 6.4
| 8
| 230
|-
| colspan=12 align=left | Source: Comissão Nacional de Eleições
|}

Maps

Graphics

Further reading

Notes

References

External links 
 Preliminary results of the 2005 election
 Angus Reid Consultants - Election Tracker

See also
 Politics of Portugal
 List of political parties in Portugal
 Elections in Portugal

2005 elections in Portugal
Legislative elections in Portugal
February 2005 events in Europe